Phyla  is a genus of eustarid plants in the verbena family, Verbenaceae. The name is derived from the Greek word φυλή (phyle), meaning "tribe", and most likely refers to the tightly clustered flowers or the spreading, mat-like growth. Members of the genus are known generally as fogfruit or frogfruit. Species once classified in the genus Lippia may be known by the common name lippia. Some species, e.g. Aztec Sweet Herb (P. dulcis), are used in cooking.

Selected species
 Phyla canescens (Kunth) Greene – hairy frogfruit/fogfruit
 Phyla chinensis Lour.
 Phyla cuneifolia (Torr.) Greene – wedgeleaf frogfruit/fogfruit, wedgeleaf
 Phyla dulcis (Trevir.) Moldenke,   – Aztec sweet herb, honeyherb, hierba dulce (Spanish), tzopelic-xihuitl (Nahuatl)
 Phyla fruticosa (Mill.) Kennedy – diamondleaf frogfruit/fogfruit
 Phyla × intermedia Moldenke – intermediate frogfruit/fogfruit
 Phyla lanceolata (Michx.) Greene – lanceleaf frogfruit/fogfruit
 Phyla nodiflora (L.) Greene – turkey tangle, sawtooth frogfruit/fogfruit
 Phyla stoechadifolia (L.) Small – southern frogfruit/fogfruit

References

External links

 
Verbenaceae genera